Imperial Settlers is a 2014 city-building themed card-driven strategy board game published by Polish company  and designed by Maciej Obszański and .

The game was inspired by the computer game series The Settlers that Trzewiczek played when he was young.

It won the 2014 Golden Geek Best Solo Board Game, 2014 Board Game Quest Awards Best Card Game and 2015 Gra Roku Advanced Game of the Year Winner awards.

Reviews
 Casus Belli (v4, Issue 12 - Nov/Dec 2014)

References

External links 

 

Board games introduced in 2014
City-building games
Polish board games
Polish card games
Card games introduced in 2014